Professor Hamid M. K. Al- Naimiy is Chancellor at the University of Sharjah in the United Arab Emirates as well as Professor of Astronomy and Astrophysics.

Educational Profile 

 Post doctorates, University of Arizona, 1978.
 PhD Astrophysics, University of Manchester, England 1977.
 MSc Astronomy, University of Manchester, England 1975.
 B.Sc. Physics, University of Baghdad, Iraq 1970 / 1971.

Conferences, Workshops and Symposiums 

 Attending (submitting papers, attendance) more than 150 conferences, Symposia and workshops (National and International, Mainly, IAU, Conferences).
 Organizing more the 30 Conferences and workshops (National, Regional and International).
 Chair of the Scientific Organizing Committee of the 1st, 2nd, 3rd, 4th, 5th, 6th, 7th, 8th, 9th, 10th, 11th and 12th Arab Astronomy & Space Sciences Conferences.
 Chair of the Scientific Organizing Committee of the first, second, third, fourth and fifth Islamic Astronomical Conference.
 Chair of the Local Organizing Committee and member of Scientific Organizing Committee for the eighth UN/ESA workshop on Basic Space Sciences, Jordan 1999.
 Member of Scientific Organizing Committee for the 10th (France 2000), 11th (Mauritius 2001), 12th (Argentina), 13th (China) (UN/ESA workshop on Basic Space).
 Chair of the Organizing committee of the First Workshop in Medical Physics, Dubai. 31 March 2004.
 Chair /Organizing committee / the first Physics Day, 3 May 2004, UAEU.
 Chair /Organizing committee / the second Physics Day, 9 May 2005, UAEU.
 Chair /Organizing committee /the third Physics Day, 10 April 2006, UAEU.
 Chair of the first International Conference of the Biological and Medical Physics, Al-Ain, UAE, 27th – 30th, March 2005.
 Coordinator of the International Conference "Engage Iraq's Science and Technology Community in Developing its Country" September, 15th – 18th, 2005, Amman / Jordan.
 Chair of the National Technical Organizing Committee and member of Scientific Organizing Committee for the UN/ESA/NASA/UAE workshop on Basic Space Science and IHY, Al-Ain, UAE, 20 – 23 November 2005.
 Member of the International Scientific Organizing Committee and for the Second UN/ NASA workshop on Basic Space Science and IHY, India, November, 27 – 2 December 2006.
 Member of the International Scientific Organizing Committee and for the Third UN/ ESA / NASA workshop on Basic Space Science and IHY, Tokyo/Japan, June, 18th  – 23rd, 2007.
 President of the first Forum for young and amateur astronomers and space scientists, Lattikia / Syria, 25–30 August 2007.
 Chair of the Local and Scientific Organizing committee for the first international conference on Arab's and Muslim's History of sciences, 24th – 27th / March / 2008.
 Member of the International Scientific Organizing Committee and for the Fourth UN/ ESA / NASA /JAXA workshop on Basic Space Science and IHY, Sozopol /Bulgaria, June, 2nd – 6th, 2008.
 President of the second Forum for young and amateur astronomers and space scientists, Tripoli / Libya, 3–6 August 2007.
 Chair of the Organizing committee of the Conference on Gulf Maritime through Ages, 17th – 19th / March / 2008.
 Chair of the Organizing Committee of the Exploration of the Moon International Congress, 17th – 19th / May / 2008.
 President of the second Forum for young and amateur astronomers and space scientists, Constantine / Algeria, 1–6 August 2007.
 Member of the International Scientific Organizing Committee and for the Fifth UN/ ESA / NASA /JAXA workshop on Basic Space Science and IHY, Deojion /Korea, September, 22nd h – 26th , 2008 .
 Chair of the second International AWSOME workshop (Sharjah – Stanford) in collaboration with NASA/UN, 22 – 24, February 2010. 
 Chair of the first Sharjah Science festival and conference, Sharjah University and Sharjah Education Council 7-8/4/2010.
 Chair of the second Sharjah Science festival and conference, Sharjah University and Sharjah Education Council 4-5/5/2011.
 Chairman of the Scientific Committee of Sharjah International Conference on Nuclear and Renewable Energy (SHJ-NRE11) .Energies for the 21st Century, 3–5 April 2011, The University of Sharjah.
 Chair of the Local and Scientific Organizing committee for the 2nd international conference on Arab's and Muslim's History of sciences, 8th – 10th / December / 2014.
 Chair of the Local and Scientific Organizing committee for the 3rd international conference on Arab's and Muslim's History of sciences, 7th – 9th / December / 2018.
 Chair and Member of Many International and Regional Conferences in different field organized by the University of Sharjah 2014 – Up to Date.

Example of some International conferences and workshops:
 The 12th United Nations/European Space Agency Workshop on Basic Space Science. Hosted by the China National Space Administration, on behalf of the Government of P.R. China, Beijing, P.R. China,24-28 May 2004: http://www.unoosa.org/oosa/SAP/act2003/china/index.html

 The 1st UAE International Conference on Biological and Medical Physics, United Arab Emirates, 27–30 March 2005: http://icbmp.uaeu.ac.ae/

 The 1st UN/ESA/NASA Workshop on the International Heliophysical Year and Basic Space Sciences, United Arab Emirates, 20–23 November 2005: http://www.ihy.uaeu.ac.ae/workshopbg.htm

 The 2nd UN/ESA/NASA Workshop on the International Heliophysical Year and Basic Space Sciences, Bangalore, India 27 November – 1 December 2006:http://www.iiap.res.in/ihy/

 The 3th UN/ESA/NASA Workshop on the International Heliophysical Year and Basic Space Sciences, Tokyo, Japan 18–22 June 2007:http://solarwww.mtk.nao.ac.jp/UNBSS_Tokyo07/

 The First International Conference on Arabs' and Muslims’ History of Sciences, Sharjah University, UAE 24–27 March 2008:https://www.sharjah.ac.ae/English/Conferences/arabsandmuslims/Pages/default.aspx

 The 4th UN/ESA/NASA/JAXA Workshop on the International Heliophysical Year and Basic Space Sciences, Sozopol, Bulgaria 2–6 June 2008: http://www.stil.bas.bg/UNBSS-IHY/

 Global Space Technology Forum / Space Technology Commercialization for the Future, ADNEC, Abu Dhabi, UAE, 16–18 November 2008: http://smg-conferences.com/index.php?module=conferencedetails&page=other&conference=3Teaching Courses:

 International Astronomical Union – UNESCO Conference (IYA2009 OPPINING) & Symposium 260, "The Rôle of Astronomy in Society and Culture", Palais de 1'UNESCO, Paris (France) 15-23, 2009: http://www.astronomy2009.fr/opening

 The 5th UN/ESA/NASA/Korea Workshop on the International Heliophysical Year and Basic Space Sciences, Korea 22–25 September 2009: http://ihy.kasi.re.kr/meeting.php

 Sharjah International Conference on Nuclear and Renewable Energy (SHJ-NRE11) .Energies for the 21st Century, 3–5 April 2011, The University of Sharjah: http://www.energies2011.com/

 The 2nd International Conference on Arabs' and Muslims’ History of Sciences, Sharjah University, UAE 8–10 December 2014: http://www.sharjah.ac.ae/en/about/news-center/Pages/Event-Details.aspx?mcid=120

 The IAU General Assembly / the International Conference, Honolulu, Hawaii - 3–14 August 2015: https://astronomy2015.org/

 The 3rd International Conference on Arabs' and Muslims’ History of Sciences, Sharjah University, UAE 5–7 December 2017: http://www.sharjah.ac.ae/en/Media/Conferences/ICHS17/Pages/default.aspx

 The XXXth IAU General Assembly / the International Astronomical Conference, Vienna, 20–31 August 2018: https://astronomy2018.univie.ac.at/home/

Awards 

 World Education Congress /Asia Award for Outstanding Contribution to Education, 25 September 2011, Dubai, UAE.
 Khalifa Award for Education 2009/2010 (In the Field of Higher Education). United Arab Emirates.
 The Certificate of Appreciation from International Astronomical Union & UNESCO for the Outstanding Contribution to the success of the International Year of Astronomy 2009.
 Korea Astronomy & Space Science Institute Plaque, in recognition of his contribution to the 2009 UN/NASA/ESA/JAXA workshop on Basic Space Sciences and the International Heliophysical Year 2007, 22 September 2009. Daejeon/Korea.
 NASA Plaque in Recognition of his contributions as the Coordinator for the Asian & Pacific region on IHY2007, for the period 2005 – 2009.
 UN appreciation letter for the best scientists who contributed excellently in organizing the UN/ESA/NASA workshops. The third UN/ESA/NASA workshop, Tokyo/Japan, 18th – 22nd, May, 2007.
 Personality of the Week. The International Heliophysical Year IHY2007. On the occasion of the 50 year anniversary for IGY, launching the first world space rocket Sputnik. IHY International Committee, 8 June 2007:  http://ihy2007.org/newsroom/weekly_070612.shtml
 The Award for the best department chair, teacher and researcher for the year 2006 from UAE University.
 Included in International Marquis Who's Who for the 21st century, 19th Edition, 2002 and 2004
 The best scientific public media Publication Prize. The Iraqi Scientific Research Council 1987, Baghdad, Iraq.
 The best Scientific Researcher Prize. The Iraqi Scientific Research Council 1984, Baghdad, Iraq.

Publications

Books

 Space Physics, University of Baghdad, Two Volumes.
 Astronomy 1981
 Meteorology 1981
 Space Colonies, Cultural & Media Ministry publications, Baghdad – Iraq 1986.
 The International Radio Telescopes, Scientific Research Council publications, Baghdad, Iraq 1987.
 Calculations of the beginning of the lunar months (during the Period 1987 – 2000) Ministry of Awqaf Publications, Baghdad, Iraq, 1988.
 Intelligent life in the Universe. Cultural & Media Ministry publications, Baghdad, Iraq, 1989.
 Exploration of Giant Planets, Cultural & Media Ministry publications, Baghdad, Iraq, 1994.
 The Arab Scientists Achievements in Physics and Astronomy, Cultural & Media Ministry publications, Baghdad, Iraq 1993.
 The Secret of the Universe in the Verses of the Holly Qur'an, Arab Scientific Publishers, Beirut, Lebanon, 2001.
 Proceedings /the 1st International Conference on Astronomy and Space Sciences (4–6 May 1998). The Editor / Publications of Al al-Bayt University, 2000.
 Proceedings /the 9th United Nations/European Space Agency workshops in Basic space Science, (13–17 March 1999). Co-Editor / Publications of Astrophysics of Space science 273/1-4, 2001.
 The Hijra Calendar in the meridians & setting times for the year 2002–2003, the Emirates Heritage Club publications 2003. With Fernini, Ilias & Obaid Allah, Ebraheem.
 The Hijra Calendar in the meridians & setting times for the year 2003–2004, the Emirates Heritage Club publications 2004. With Fernini, Ilias & Obaid Allah, Ebraheem.
 The Hijra Calendar in the meridians & setting times for the year 2004–2005, the Emirates Heritage Club publications 2005. With Fernini, Ilias & Obaid Allah, Ebraheem.
 Priorities of the Iraqi Science and Technology Community, May 2004, in co-operation with ASTF team.
 The Hijra Calendar in the meridians & setting times for the year 2005–2006, the Emirates Heritage Club publications 2006. With Fernini, Ilias & Sakher Abdullal
 The Hijra Calendar in the meridians & setting times for the year 2006–2007, the Emirates Heritage Club publications 2007. With Fernini, Ilias & Sakher Abdullal
 Editing the Proceedings of the Crescent Visibility problems between Astronomy and Shareah Symposium, Sharjah University Publications, 2006.
 Editing the Special Issue if the International Journal of Scientific Research volume 16. Proceedings of the 1st UAE International Conference on Biological & Medical Physics (27–30 March 2006). The Editor in Chief / Publications of UAE University, 2007.
 The Hijra Calendar in the meridians & setting times for the year 2007–2008, the Emirates Heritage Club publications 2008. With Fernini, Ilias & Sakher Abdullal.
 The Hijra Calendar in the meridians & setting times for the year 2008–2009, the Emirates Heritage Club publications 2009. With Fernini, Ilias & Sakher Abdullal.
 Introduction to Astronomy, University Book Shop/Sharjah, UAE and Ithraa Publishing and Distribution / Jordan, 1st Edition 2010.
 The Hijra Calendar in the meridians & setting times for the year 2009–2010, the Emirates Heritage Club publications 2010. With Fernini, Ilias & Sakher Abdullal.
 The Hijra Calendar in the meridians & setting times for the year 2010-2011, the Emirates Heritage Club publications 2011. With Fernini, Ilias & Sakher Abdullal.
 The Astronomical     calculations and applications in the services of the Islamic Sharea’ah, Brighter Horizon Group/Sharjah, UAE, 1st Edition 2011 .
 The Hijra Calendar in the meridians & setting times for the year 2011-2012, the Emirates Heritage Club publications 2012. With Fernini, Ilias & Sakher Abdullal.
 The Hijra Calendar in the meridians & setting times for the year 2012-2013, the Emirates Heritage Club publications 2013. With Fernini, Ilias & Sakher Abdullal.
 The Hijra Calendar in the meridians & setting times for the year 2013-2014, the Emirates Heritage Club publications 2014. With Fernini, Ilias & Sakher Abdullal.
 The Hijra Calendar in the meridians & setting times for the year 2014-2015, the Emirates Heritage Club publications 2015. With Fernini, Ilias & Sakher Abdullal.
 The Hijra Calendar in the meridians & setting times for the year 2015-2016, the Emirates Heritage Club publications 2015. With Fernini, Ilias & Sakher Abdullal.
 The Hijra Calendar in the meridians & setting times for the year 2016-2017, the Emirates Heritage Club publications 2015. With Fernini, Ilias & Sakher Abdullal.
 The Verses of the Holy Qur'an on the Universe,2016, the Qur’an Dubai awards.

Scientific Papers (International & Regional Journals) 
 Al-Naimiy, H. M. K: Determination of the elements of Eclipsing Variables, RW Gem and AY Cam. By Fourier analysis of Their Light Changes, Astrophysics and Space Science Journal, Vol. 46, pp. 261 – 284, 1977.

 Al-Naimiy, H. M. K: Theoretical Light Curve of Close Binary System. IAU Bulletins No. XVI, 1976

 Al – Naimiy, H. M. K. and Budding, E. : Analysis of Red and IR Wide-Band Photometry of Algol, Astrophysics and Space Science Journal, Vol. 51,     pp. 265 – 282, 1977.

 Al – Naimiy, H. M. K. Linearized Limb-Darkening Coefficients For Use in Analysis of Eclipsing Binary Light Curves, Astrophysics and Space Science Journal Vol. 53, pp. 181–192. 1978.

 Al – Naimiy, H. M. K., Budding, E., Jassor, D., and Sadik, A., Observations of UV Psc and XY Cet, IBVS No. 1415, 1978.

 Al – Naimiy, H. M. K. Synthetic Light Curves of Two Eclipsing Binary System U Sge and Aw UMa, Astrophysics and Space Science Journal, Vol. 56, pp. 219–238, 1978.

 Kopal, Z. and Al – Naimiy, H. M. K. Fourier Analysis of the Light Curves of Eclipsing Variables XIX, Astrophysics and Space Science Journal, Vol. 57, pp. 479–489, 1978.

 Al – Naimiy, H. M. K. Fourier Analysis of the Light Curves of Eclipsing Variables XIXa, Astrophysics and Space Sciences Journal, Vol. 59, pp. 3–11, 1978.

 Al – Naimiy, H. M. K. Observation of the Peculiar Eclipsing Variable ER Vulpecule, IBVS., No. 1481, 1978.

 Al – Naimiy, H. M. K. The star ER Vul. is an RS CVn Eclipsing type Binaries.  IAU publications, No. XVII, 1982.

 Al – Naimiy, H. M. K. Photometric Observations and Light Curve Analysis of the Peculiar System ER Vul., Astronomy and Astrophysics Supplement Series, Vol. 43, pp. 85–90, 1981.

 Al – Naimiy, H. M. K. Light Variation in the W UMa System Tz Boo., Astronomical Journal, Vol. 87, No 1518, pp. 1041–1043, 1982.

 Al – Naimiy, H. M. K., the Iraqi National Astronomical Observatory, Proceeding of the IAU publications, no. XVII, 1982

 Al – Naimiy, H. M. K, Sadik, A. and Oszczak, S: Astronomical Determination of Latitude and Longitude "Application to Al-Battani Observatory" Journal of Space and Astronomy Research (JSAR), Vol. 1., No. 1, pp. 45–53, 1984.

 Al – Naimiy, H. M. K, Flaih, H. A. and Al-Ukaidey, K.: Microcomputer Based Optical Telescope Control of Al- BATTANI Observatory, Journal of Space and Astronomy Research (JSAR), Vol. 1, No.1, pp. (17-31), 1984.

 Al – Naimiy, H. M. K, Mutter, A. A. and Flaih, H.A: Photoelectric Observations of the Eclipsing Variable B Per., IBVS, No. 2520, 1984.

 Al - Naimiy, H. M. K. and Sikab, A.: Fourier Analysis of the Light Changes of Four Algol-Type Eclipsing Variables, Astrophysics and Space Science Journal, Vol. 103, pp. 115–124. 1984.

 Al – Naimiy, H. M. K. Mutter, A. A. and Flaih, H.: UBV photometry and Light – Curve Analysis of Algol. Astrophysics and Space Science Journal, Vol. 108, pp. 227–236, 1985.

 Al – Naimiy, H. M. K: The Iraqi National Astronomical Observatory, Astrophysics and Space Science Journal, Vol. 118, pp. 51–56, 1986.

 Al – Naimiy, H. M. K, Al-Mahdi, H.A, Al-Sekab, A. O. In addition, Mutter A., Geometrical and Physical Elements of Four B Lyrae Type Eclipsing Variables, Astrophysics and Space Science Journal, Vol. 117, pp. 351–361, 1985.

 Al – Naimiy, H. M. K. and Salim, S.: The Scientific Methods of Findings the beginning of the lunar months. مجلة الرسالة الإسلامية The Islamic Resalla Journal. Iraqi Awqaf Ministry Publications, Vol. 202, 1987. (In Arabic).

 Al – Naimiy, H. M. K. The Iraqi Vision on Remote Sensing Science and Technology, Proceeding of the Scanning Image & Remote Sensing Symposium, Arab Scientific Research Councils / Rabat, Morocco, 1987.

 Al – Naimiy, H. M. K. Space Astrophysics and its applications, Science & Future Journal, no 4, 1987.

 Al-Naimiy, H.M.K. Future View for colonization of the Solar System, Science & Future Journal, no 6, 1988.

 Al – Naimiy, H. M. K. and Fleyeh, H. A: Photometric Observations and Light Curve Analysis of ST Aqu. Astrophysics and Space Science Journal, Vol. 151 pp. 29–38, 1989.

 Al- Naimiy, H. M. K. The Supernova (Birth & Star Evaluation), Afaq Arabia Journal, Cultural & Media Ministry publication, year 13th, 1988.

 Al- Naimiy, H. M. K. Extraterrestrial Intelligent life in our Galaxy, Science and development Journal, Beirut / Lebanon, Special volume in Astronomy and Space Sciences Journal, September 1988.

 Al–Naimiy, H. M. K., Fleyeh, H. and Al-Razzaz, J. N: New Photoelectric Observation of W Uma System 44i Boo. IBVS, Vol. 2956, 1989.

 Al- Naimiy, H. M. K. Exploration and colonization of the Space. Afaq Arabia Journal, Cultural and Media Ministry publication, No 11, the year 13th, 1988.

 Al- Naimiy, H. M. K. Turning points in Astronomy in the Arabic Sciences Heritage. Proceeding of the first Regional Symposium for Arab's History of Sciences / The Arab Science Heritage / Baghdad, 1989, pp 16.

 Al – Naimiy, H. M. K. and Fleyeh, H.: Photoelectric Observations of ST Aqr., IBVS, Vol. 3277, 1989.

 Al – Naimiy, H. M. K, Fleyeh, H., and Al-Razzaz, J.: New Photoelectric Observations and Light Curve Analysis of the Eclipsing Variable 44I Boo Astrophysics and Space Sciences Journal, Vol. 151, pp. 135–147, 1989.

 Al- Naimiy, H. M. K. and Jarad Majid. The Crescent between the Astronomical Calculations and the actual visibility, The 5th Scientific Research Council Conference, Vol. 7, 1989, Baghdad.

 Al- Naimiy, H. M. K. Turning points in Physics in the Arabic Sciences Heritage. Proceeding of the third Regional Symposium for Arab's History of Sciences / The Arab Science Heritage / Baghdad, 1990, pp 161.

 Al – Naimiy, H. M. K, Jabbar, S. R., Fleyeh, H. A. and Al-Razzaz, J. M.: Fourier Analysis of the Light Changes of Eclipsing Variables in the Frequency-Domain, Astrophysics and Space Science Journal, Vol. 159, pp. 279–293, 1989.

 Al – Naimiy, H. M. K., the Role of the Arabic Astronomy Heritage on modern sciences. Proceeding of the Arab Heritage in Basic Sciences Conference, The Arab Region Scientific Research Committee, College of Science, Al-Fateh University, Libya, January 1990, pp 477.

 Al – Naimiy, H. M. K. and Jarad, Majeed, Evaluation of the Islamic Occasions in the 15th Hejri century. Alresala Aleslamia Journal, the 6th year, 1990, No 255, pp193.

 Al – Naimiy, H. M. K., the Crescents of the Islamic Hejri Months in Australia continent, the Iraqi Society for Physics and Mathematics Journal, No 12, pp 407,1991.

 Al – Naimiy, H. M. K and Al-Hindawy, A. M. A: A New Set of Geometrical and Physical Elements of the Eclipsing Variable PP Lac, Astrophysics and Space Science Journal, Vol. 198, pp. 231–236, 1992.

 Al – Naimiy, H. M. K., The relation between Astrology and Parapsychology, Proceeding of the Parapsychology & Heritage Symposium, Parapsychology Research Center, June 1992.

 Al-Dargazelli, S., Hussein, J. N., Al- Naimiy, H. M. and Fatoohi, L.: The Astronomical Methods of Finding the Julian Dates of the Islamic Events Before Hijra, the Journal of the Institute of the Middle East Studies Vol. XI, 1992.

 Al – Naimiy, H. M. K., Effects of the Celestial Objects on Organisms (Humans), Proceeding of the Symposium of the Parapsychology on Science view, June 1993.

 Al – Naimiy, H. M. K., Astronomical calculations for Mawaqeet Al-Salat, the Iraqi Society for Physics and Mathematics Journal, No 13, pp 179,1994.

 Al – Naimiy, H. M. K., The periodical events of the New Moon and New condition for Crescent visibility after sunset, The Iraqi Journal for Sciences. Baghdad University publications, Vol. 35, 1994.

 Al – Naimiy, H. M. K., Astronomical Techniques for the Beginning of the Lunar Month Determinations, Mathematical and Physics Journal, Vol. 1, 1994.

 Al – Naimiy, H. M. K., The relation between Prediction and Astrology in Old Iraq, Parapsychology Research Journal, The Iraqi Parapsychology Research Center No 1, 1994

 Al – Naimiy, H. M. K and Al-Abudi, B: Two Short RS CVn Type Binaries UV PSC and BH Vir, Iraqi Journal of Science (University of Baghdad), Vol. 35, 1994.

 Al – Naimiy, H. M. K, and Al-Abudi, B. : Star Spots Analysis For Short Period Group of RS CVn-Type Binaries, Iraqi Journal of Science (University of Baghdad), Vol. 36, 1995.

 Al - Naimiy, H. M. K and Zaki, W. H. A.: Synthetic Light Curves of x-ray Binary Stars, Iraqi Journal of Science, Vol. 36, 1995.

 Al - Naimiy, H. M. K., and Jarad, M.: Determination of the angle of Qebla direction /direct applications to Iraqi Mosques, The Arab Science Heritage Journal, Vol.3, 1995.

 Al – Naimiy, H. M. K and Barghouthi, I, Babylonian Astronomical Calculations, (In Arabic), Journal of Al-Murekh Al-Arabi, 1997.

 Al – Naimiy, H. M. K and Barghouthi, I, the Ratio of the Arab Scientists Contributions in Natural and Cosmological Sciences to the other Sciences, Journal of Al-Murekh Al-Arabi, 1997.

 Al – Naimiy, H. M. K: Remote Sensing Techniques for Comparative Studies of Water-Sheds in Selected Basins in the ESCWA Region, Expert Group Meeting on the Implications of Agenda 21 for Integrated Water Management in the ESCWA Region, 1996.

 Wardat, M. A., Al-Naimiy, H. M., Barghouthi, I. A., and Sabat, H. A.: New Elements for Three Eclipsing X-Ray Binary Systems (Hz Her, Cent X-3 and Vela X-1). Astrophysics and Space Science Journal, 260, 335, 1999.

 Sabat, H. A, Al-Naimiy, H. M., Bargouthi, I. And Wardat, M. A.: Synthetic Light- Curves of Some Eclipsing X-Ray Binary Stars, Astrophysics and Space Science Journal, 260, 347, 1999.

 Al – Naimiy, H. M. K. and T. Al-Masharfa, Determination of the Physical & Geometrical elements of the two Contact Binary System (Sw Lac and OOAql,) Astrophysics & Space Science Journal, Vol. 273, 83-93, 2000.

 Al- Naimiy, H. M. K. and Konsul K.: Astronomy and Space Sciences in Jordan. Bulletin of Teaching of Astronomy in Asian – Pacific Region, No. 17 Japan, 2000, PP 27.

 Al- Naimiy, H. M. K. Cynthia, P. C., Chamcham, K., Padmasiri De Alwis, H. S.Pineda De Carias, M. C., H. T. and Boggino, H. T. Research and Education in Basic Space Science, The Approach Pursued in the UN/ESA Workshops. COSPAR Information Bulletin, No. 148, 2000.

 Al-Naimiy, H. M. K., Hajjar R., Querci, F., Querci, M and Konsul, The Network of Oriental Robotic Telescopes (NORT), An Arab Project, The 9th UN/ESA Workshop on Basic Space Science, Toulouse, France, 26–29 June 2000. UN / Seminars of the UN Programs on Space Applications, No. 12, 2000.

 Kandalyan, R. A, Al-Naimiy H. M. K. and Khassawneh, A. H.: Star Formation Properties of Spiral Galaxies. Astrophysics & Space Science Journal, Vol. 273, 103-115, 2000.

 Kandalyan R. A., Kalloghlian A. T., Al-Naimiy H. M. K., Khassawneh A. M., Investigation of Barred Galaxies. VI. A Comparative Statistics of SB and SA galaxies. The Cold Gas Properties, Astrophysics Journal, V.43, 411, 2000.

 Al-Naimiy, H. M. K., Star Spots Studies for Three Short Period RS CVn-Type Binaries. Astrophysics Journal, Vol. 44, No 2, pp 285–296, 2001.

 Al- Naimiy, H. M. K. The Importance and Needs of Astronomy & Space Sciences in Arab Countries. Bulletin of Teaching of Astronomy in Asian-Pacific Region, No. 17. PP13 Japan 2001.

 Al – Naimiy, H. M. K., and Al-Masharfeh, T.H.SH., New Set of Geometric & Physical Elements of the two Variable Stars (SW Lacertae and OO Aquilae).AL-MANARAH Journal, Al al-Bayt University Publications, Vol. VII, No. I, pp 199 – 211, May 2001.

 Kalloghlian, A.T., Kandalyan, R.A. and Al-Naimiy H.M.K., Investigation of Barred Galaxies. VII. A comparative Statistics of SB and Sa Galaxies. Near IR Region, Vol.43, No 2, Astrophysics Journal, 2001.

 Kandalyan, R. A. and Al-Naimiy H.M.K., Board – Band Radio to X-Ray Properties of Seyfert galaxy, Astrophysics Journal, Vol. 45, NO.3, 2002.

 Al-Naimiy, H.M.K., Fixing the Beginning of Ramadan and Shawal, using the Islamic Sharea’a & Astrophysical Methods "Application to Some Arabic Cities", Italian Astronomical Journal "Giornale di Astronomia" – anno V. 2002. n3.

 AL-Naimiy, H.M.K., Arabs Space Research Agencies (ASRA), Proceeding of "The 2nd Symposium for Scientific Research Vision in Arab World", Al-Sharija, UAE, 24–27 March 2002.

 AL-Naimiy, H.M.K., Emirate Sat "Emirate Micro Satellites", "Proceeding of the 2nd Symposium for Scientific Research Vision in Arab World", Al-Sharjah, UAE, 24–27 March 2002.

 Al-Naimiy, H.M.K., Light Curves Changes of Eclipsing X-ray Binary Stars of Neutron Star Component.  Proceedings of the "New Direction for Close Binary Studies".  "The Royal Road to the Stars", Canakkale Onsekies Mart University, Astrophysics Research Center, Turkey, Vol. 3, pp 335, 2003.

 Al-Naimiy, H.M.K., "Problems facing Islam regarding fixing the beginning of    the Hijra Months & The methodologies of calculating the Islamic Prying time" The 3rd Islamic Astronomical Conference, Amman, Jordan 20-22 / 10 / 2003.

 Al- Naimiy, H. M. K. Cynthia, P. C., Chamcham, K., Padmasiri De Alwis, H. S.Pineda De Carias, M. C., H. T., Boggino, H. T and Haubold, H. Research and Education in Basic Space Science, Developing BSS World-Wide "A Decade of UN/ESA workshop", Ed: by W. Wamsteker, R. Albrech and H.Haubolb. Kluwer Academic Publishers, Boston, May 2004.

 Al- Barghouthi, I., Abu-Samra, M.A., Issa, M.S., Al-Naimiy, H.M.K., The Astronomical Contributions of the Muslim Scholars (During the 8th – 14th century), Giornale di Astronomia – anno VII. 2004. N4.

 Al – Naimiy, H. M. K and Konsul, K., "Basic Space Sciences in Jordan" "Developing BSS World-Wide" "A Decade of UN/ESA workshop", Ed: by W. Wamsteker, R. Albrech and H.Haubold. Kluwer Academic Publishers, Boston, May 2004.

 Al- Barghouthi, I., Abu-Samra, M.A., Afanah, H.M., Al-Naimiy, H.M.K., The Crescents between Astronomy and the Fiqh, the Islamic University Journal- Gaza, Vol.12, No. 2, 2004.

 Al – Naimiy, H. M. K, "Astronomy & Space Sciences in Arab Countries. Proceeding of the 12th UA/ESA workshop for Basic Space Sciences. 24th – 28th, May, 2004." Beijing / China. To be published in Astrophysics & Space Science Journal, 2005.

 Al – Naimiy, H. M. K., BSS in Arab Region (Past, Present & Future), SEMINARS of the United Nation Program on Space Applications. Selected papers from Activities held in 2004. No.14, pp 67, 2005.

 Al - Naimiy, H.M.K with ASTF’s Initiative Committee, Survey of Iraq’s S&T community, The International Conference to Engage Iraq’s Science & Technology Community in Developing its Country 18–20 September 2005.

 Al – Naimiy, H. M. K., Light Variations of Eclipsing X-Ray Binaries with compact Components, IJST Journal, Vol. 1, No. 2, 2006.

 Al – Naimiy, H. M. K., The new moon and the crescent in Astronomical and Feqeh View, Publication of the College of Graduate Studies and Research, Sharjah University, 2006.

 H. Haubold, B.J. Thompson, H.M.K. Al-Naimiy, J.M. Davila, N.Gopalswamy, K.M. Groves, D. K. Scherer, the IHY/United Nations Distributed Observatory Development Program, COSPAR Publication (Unispace), 2006.

 M.Kitamura (Japan), D.Wentzel (USA), A.A.Henden and J.Bennett (USA), H.M.K.Al-Naimiy (UAE), A.M.Mathai (India), H.J.Haubold (UN), The United Nations Basic Space Sciences Initiative :The TRIPOD Concept, Astronomy for the developing world, IAU Special Session no. 5, 2007.

 Al – Naimiy, H. M. K., the Babylonian Astronomy (their contributions into Solar Eclipses) "1400 BC – 1400 AC", SPSE, in press2008.

 Al – Naimiy, H. M. K.: The Gulf Telescope project, 7th Colloquium for Astronomy in Gulf countries, Bahrain Astronomical Societies, 21-22 Feb 2007.

 Al – Naimiy, H. M. K.,: The Crescent visibility problems between the Sharea' and Astronomical calculations, Proceeding of the 1st conference on Al-Sharea' Judgeship (المؤتمر القضائي الشرعي الأول), Amman, Jordan, 3 – 5 September 2007 (http://www.csjd.gov.jo/Introduction.htm).

 Al – Naimiy, H. M. K.: The International Heliophysical year and Basic Space Science in West Asia, Bull. Astro. Soc. India (2007), 727.

 Al – Naimiy, H. M. K., Proposal for Arab Space Research Agency, Global     Space Technology Forum / Space Technology Commercialization for the Future ADNEC, Abu Dhabi, UAE, 16–18 November 2008, http://smg-conferences.com/index.php?module =conferencedetails&page=other&conference = 3

 Al – Naimiy, H. M. K., Astronomical Instrumentations invented by the Muslims Scholars and used in Gulf Maritime.

 Gulf Maritime Through Ages Conference, Dr. Sultan Al Qassimi Centre of Gulf Studies in Cooperation with the Department of History and Islamic Civilization in the College of Arts, Humanities and Sciences at University of Sharjah, 17-19/11/2008. https://www.sharjah.ac.ae/ARABIC/CONFERENCES/GMTA/Pages/default.aspx.

 H. M.K.Al-Naimiy, A. A.J.Al-Douri, A. A. Alnajjar, & U. Inan, Very Low Frequency Remote Sensing Measurement of the Lower Ionosphere at Site of the United Arab Emirate. Earth, Moon and Planets Journal, Vol.104, PP189–193, 2009.

 Al – Naimiy, H. M. K., IHY and ASS in Arab States" Concentration on Iraq and UAE", Accepted for publication in The International Journal of Sun and Geo-sphere, in press 2009.

 AL-Naimiy, H.M, K, The Role of Astronomy and Space Sciences in Arab Societies and Cultures, the International Astronomical Union Publications, 260, pp 429–441, 2010.

 AL-Naimiy, H.M, K, Rebuilding the Iraqi National Astronomical Observatory, UN/ESA/NASA/JAXA Publications, in press, 2009.

  AL-Naimiy, H.M.K., Status of Research on History of Astronomy in the Arab World, Institute of Science, Technology and Civilization Publication, 2010, https://muslimheritage.com/status-research-history-astronomy-arab-world.

 AL-Naimiy, H.M, K, Special criterions for the crescent visibilities for Muslim's scholars and the astronomical calculations. The Islamic Fiquh at Arabia Stadia, 2011, in press.

 AL-Naimiy, H.M, K, Isra and Mi'raj:The Miracle of Miracles(Readings from History, Physics and Astronomy).The International Journal of Quranic Research. Malaya University press. Vol 3, No.4, 2013.

 Suhail G. Masda, Mashhoor A. Al-Wardat, Ralph Neuhäuser, and Hamid M. Al-Naimiy; Physical and Geometrical Parameters of CVBS X: The Spectroscopic Binary Gliese 762.1, Research in Astronomy and Astrophysics (RAA), Vol. 16, issue 7, article id 12. Impact Factor (2015): 1.29 Doi: 10.1088/1674- 4527/16/7/112.

 Al Wardat, Al Naimiy, H. Taani, A. Khasawneh, A. Al Banawi, O. Widyan, H. S.S., Modifie d Physical and Geometrical Elements of the Eclipsing X Ray Binary System Centaurus X 3 Astrophysical Bulletin, 2014, Vol. 69, No. 3, pp. 325 329 Impact Factor (201 3 1.000)

 Fernini, I., Al-Naimiy, H. M., Al-Hameed, A. A., Noorani, A., Javed, A., AbuJami, I.

 Sharjah Five-meter Radio Telescope, accepted, Journal of Instrumentation 2019.

References 

Emirati scientists
Living people
Academic staff of the University of Sharjah
University of Baghdad alumni
Alumni of the University of Manchester
Academic staff of United Arab Emirates University
Academic staff of Al al-Bayt University
Academic staff of the University of Baghdad
1947 births